An election to South Pembrokeshire District Council were held in May 1983. An Independent majority was maintained. It was preceded by the 1979  election and followed by the 1987 election. On the same day there were elections to the other local authorities and community councils in Wales.

Results

Amroth (one seat)

Angle (one seat)

Begelly (one seat)

Carew (one seat)

Cosheston(one seat)

Hundleton (one seat)

Lampeter Velfrey (one seat)

Manorbier(one seat)

Martletwy (one seat)

Narberth North / South (one seat)

Narberth Urban (one seat)

Pembroke Central (two seats)

Pembroke East (three seats)

Pembroke Llanion (two seats)

Pembroke Market (two seats)

Pembroke Pennar (two seats)

Penally(one seat)

St Issels (two seats)

Tenby North (two seats)

Tenby South (two seats)

References

South Pembrokeshire District Council elections
South Pembrokeshire District Council election